Microsoft DirectCompute is an application programming interface (API) that supports running compute kernels on  general-purpose computing on graphics processing units on Microsoft's Windows Vista, Windows 7 and later versions. DirectCompute is part of the Microsoft DirectX collection of APIs, and was initially released with the DirectX 11 API but runs on graphics processing units that use either DirectX 10 or DirectX 11. The DirectCompute architecture shares a range of computational interfaces with its competitors: OpenCL from Khronos Group, compute shaders in OpenGL, and CUDA from NVIDIA.

See also
 OpenCL
 CUDA
 C++ AMP

References

External links
Compute Shader Overview
DirectCompute Lecture Series
Advanced DirectX 11: DirectCompute by Example
GTC On-Demand

DirectX
GPGPU libraries